Royal Air Maroc Flight 630 was a passenger flight on 21 August 1994 which crashed approximately ten minutes after takeoff from Agadir–Al Massira Airport. All 44 passengers and crew on board were killed. It was the deadliest ATR 42 aircraft crash at that point in time. A later investigation showed that the crash was deliberately caused by one of the pilots.

Aircraft and crew 
The aircraft involved was an ATR 42-312 which had its maiden flight on 20 January 1989. The aircraft was delivered to Royal Air Maroc on 24 March the same year. The aircraft was powered by two Pratt & Whitney Canada PW120 turboprop engines.

The captain was 32-year-old Younes Khayati, who had 4,500 flight hours. The first officer was Sofia Figuigui.

Flight
Flight 630 was a scheduled flight from Agadir, Morocco to Casablanca using an ATR 42 aircraft.

Among the 40 passengers on board were a Kuwaiti prince and his wife. The prince was the brother of Sabah Al-Ahmad Al-Jaber Al-Sabah, Kuwait's minister of defence. At least 20 of the passengers were non-Moroccans. This included eight Italians, five Frenchmen, four Dutch, two Kuwaitis, and one American.

Investigation
The commission that investigated the crash determined it to be pilot suicide. Flight recorder data revealed that the ATR 42's autopilot was intentionally disconnected by Captain Khayati, who then deliberately put the aircraft into a dive. Evidence also showed that during the descent, First Officer Figuigui had sent out distress calls once aware of the captain's intentions. The Moroccan pilots union disputed the suicide explanation, claiming that Captain Khayati was mentally fit and showed no signs of frustration, and instead claiming that Captain Khayati reported a "technical problem" prior to takeoff, although the investigative commission never found evidence supporting this claim. The crash was the deadliest incident involving an ATR 42 aircraft at that point in time.

See also 

 Accidents and incidents involving the ATR 42 family
 Aviation safety
 
 List of accidents and incidents involving commercial aircraft
 Trigana Air Service Flight 267, current deadliest aviation accident involving an ATR 42
 Suicide by pilot

Specific incidents
 EgyptAir Flight 990
 Germanwings Flight 9525
 Japan Airlines Flight 350
 LAM Mozambique Airlines Flight 470
 SilkAir Flight 185

References

External links
A photo of the accident aircraft

Airliner accidents and incidents involving deliberate crashes
1994 in Morocco
Accidents and incidents involving the ATR 42
Aviation accidents and incidents in 1994
Aviation accidents and incidents in Morocco
Mass murder in 1994
Murder–suicides in Africa
630
August 1994 events in Africa
1994 disasters in Morocco